Avilovo is the name of several rural localities in Russia:
Avilovo, Oryol Oblast, a village in Ploskovsky Selsoviet of Dmitrovsky District in Oryol Oblast
Avilovo, Volgograd Oblast, a selo in Kuptsovsky Selsoviet of Kotovsky District in Volgograd Oblast